The National Bank Cricket Arena is a cricket ground in Karachi, Pakistan. The first Test match played at the National Stadium was in 1955 between Pakistan and India. The most recent Test match hosted by the ground, was played in March 2021 between Pakistan and Australia. The ground has also hosted 48 One Day Internationals (ODIs), the first of these was in 1980 between Pakistan and the West Indies.

90 Test centuries have been scored at the ground. The Pakistani Alimuddin became the first Test centurion at the ground, scoring 103 not out against India in 1955. Younis Khan's innings of 313 from 568 deliveries was highest, scored against Sri Lanka in 2009. It was during this match that the 2nd and 3rd highest Test centuries at the ground were made, the Sri Lankans Mahela Jayawardene and Thilan Samaraweera made 240 and 231 respectively. Saleem Malik holds the record for the most Test centuries scored at the ground, with 4.

Zaheer Abbas scored the first ODI century at the ground making 113 from 99 deliveries against India in 1983. The West Indian Viv Richards holds the record for the highest ODI innings at the ground, 181 from 125 deliveries came against Sri Lanka in 1987. The highest ODI innings at the ground by a Pakistani is 136, made by Salman Butt in 2008.

The stadium also maintains an honours board.

Key
 * denotes that the batsman was not out.
 Inns. denotes the number of the innings in the match.
 Balls denotes the number of balls faced in an innings.
 NR denotes that the number of balls was not recorded.
 Parentheses next to the player's score denotes his century number at the National Stadium, Karachi.
 The column title Date refers to the date the match started.
 The column title Result refers to whether the player's team won, lost or if the match was drawn.

Test centuries

The following table summarises the Test centuries scored at the National Stadium, Karachi.

One Day International centuries

The following table summarises the One Day International centuries scored at the National Stadium, Karachi.

T20 International centuries

The following table summarises the T20 International centuries scored at the National Stadium, Karachi.

References 

National Stadium
Cricket grounds in Pakistan
Centuries
Centuries